Guernica Mancini is a Swedish singer. She was the former lead singer of Thundermother having parted ways with the band in early February 2023.

Biography
Mancini was 14 years old when she formed the all-female band "Banda Sept" which performed live all over Sweden.
In 2007, Mancini enrolled at the Musicians Institute in Los Angeles where she won a songwriting contest which led her to record with Black Eyed Peas music producer Darryl Swann. After leaving Musicians Institute, she formed the all-female band "Inglourious", performing at music venues around the United States such as House of Blues, Hard Rock Cafe, The Key and The Roxy.

Mancini teamed up with Jeff Young of Megadeth as the lead singer for his band "Souls on 11", going on tour and releasing a live performance DVD.

References 

Swedish women singer-songwriters
Swedish singer-songwriters
Living people
Year of birth missing (living people)